Philip H. Bucksbaum (born January 14, 1953 in Grinnell, Iowa) is an American atomic physicist, the Marguerite Blake Wilbur Professor in Natural Science in the Departments of Physics, Applied Physics, and Photon Science at Stanford University and the SLAC National Accelerator Laboratory.  He also directs the Stanford PULSE Institute.

He is a member of the National Academy of Sciences and a Fellow of the American Academy of Arts and Sciences, the American Physical Society, and the Optical Society, and was elected President of the Optical Society for 2014. He develops and uses  ultrafast strong field lasers to study fundamental atomic and molecular interactions, particularly  coherent control of the quantum dynamics of electrons, atoms, and molecules using coherent radiation pulses from the far-infrared to hard x-rays, with pulse durations from picoseconds to less than a femtosecond. Bucksbaum is the recipient of the 2020 Norman F. Ramsey Prize in Atomic, Molecular and Optical Physics, and in Precision Tests of Fundamental Laws and Symmetries for his pioneering explorations of ultrafast strong field physics from the optical to the X-ray regime.

Biography

Early life and education 

Bucksbaum spent his early childhood in Grinnell, a small farming and college community in south-central Iowa. He graduated as the class valedictorian from Washington High School in Cedar Rapids in 1971.  He received a bachelor's degree in Physics from Harvard College in 1975. Bucksbaum attended graduate school at the University of California at Berkeley, receiving his Ph.D. in 1980.

Professional career 

Following a one-year postdoctoral appointment at Lawrence Berkeley Laboratory, Bucksbaum joined Bell Telephone Laboratories, where he remained until Columbia University appointed him Adjunct Associate Professor in Applied Physics in 1989.  In 1990 he moved to Ann Arbor, MI to accept a Professorship in Physics at the University of Michigan. He became Otto Laporte Collegiate Professor in Physics in 1997, and Peter Franken University Professor in 2005.

Bucksbaum joined the faculty of Stanford in 2005, with joint appointments in Physics, Applied Physics, and Photon Science.  He was named to the Marguerite Blake Wilbur Chair in Natural Science at Stanford in 2009,  and currently directs the PULSE Institute at Stanford and SLAC.

Research summary 

Bucksbaum's graduate research at Berkeley was on the parity non-conserving neutral weak interaction in atomic thallium. He co-authored a textbook on the larger subject of electroweak interactions after completing his doctoral thesis.

At Bell Laboratories he became interested in ultrafast and strong field laser-matter interactions. For a time he co-held the record for the shortest wavelength coherent radiation produced in the laboratory.   He was one of the team that used similar methods to develop  the first ultrafast angle-resolved vuv photoemission methods.
In 1985 he turned to the study of strong-field ionization of atoms. His early work on above threshold ionization of atoms established the role of ponderomotive forces in laser-electron interactions through studies of electron surfing in ultrafast laser pulses as well as the high-intensity Kapitsa–Dirac effect.  He also discovered and explained the mechanism of bond softening in strong-field molecular dissociation.
His pioneering development of broadband coherent THz radiation (so-called "half-cycle pulses")
helped to advance the field of ultrafast THz spectroscopy. He has subsequently used ultrafast lasers to study problems in quantum sculpting, quantum information,
and coherent control of atomic and molecular dynamics.

Bucksbaum helped to establish the new field of ultrafast x-ray science in early work at the Advanced Photon Source at Argonne National Laboratory
and most recently strong-field coherent x-ray-atom physics at x-ray free-electron lasers.

Professional service 

Bucksbaum  served terms on the American Physical Society Executive Board, the Optical Society Board of Directors, and the National Academy of Sciences Board on Physics and Astronomy, as well as its Committee on AMO Science (CAMOS). He chaired its Decal Study in AMO Science, AMO 2010.  He has been a member of advisory committees for the Department of Energy Division on Basic Energy Science (BESAC), NIST (Committee for Physics), The National Science Foundation, and Science Advisory Committees for the Advanced Light Source at Berkeley National Lab, the Advanced Photon Source at Argonne National Lab, and the Linac Coherent Light Source at SLAC National Accelerator Lab. As of 2013 he was Chair of the Board on Physics and Astronomy of the National Academy.

Bucksbaum was President of the Optical Society in 2014.

He has served on the Editorial Board of Physical Review Letters, and was the founding editor of the American Institute of Physics Virtual Journal of Ultrafast Science.
At Stanford and SLAC, he has served as Chair of the Photon Science faculty  and also Director of the Chemical Science Division. .

Selected published works 

 

 
Information storage and retrieval through quantum phase, Ahn J., T. Weinacht & P. Bucksbaum, 2000. Science, 287, 463-465.

Bibliography 
 Schouten, Katherine. At Home in the Heartland: A Bucksbaum Family Album. Chicago: History Works, 2007. Print.
 The Class of '75: Reflections on the Last Quarter of the 20th Century by Harvard Graduates. New York: New, 2003. Print.
 Philip Bucksbaum. The American Institute of Physics. AIP History Center Array of Contemporary Physicists, n.d. Web. 19 May 2013.

References

External links
full list of Bucksbaum's publications on Google Scholar

Members of the United States National Academy of Sciences
Fellows of the American Academy of Arts and Sciences
Fellows of the American Physical Society
Fellows of Optica (society)
Presidents of Optica (society)
Living people
1953 births
Harvard College alumni
University of Michigan faculty
University of California, Berkeley alumni
Presidents of the American Physical Society